Saluting Battery was an artillery battery in the British Overseas Territory of Gibraltar.

Description
The battery was above the Line Wall Curtain in Gibraltar and defended the west side including Gibraltar Harbour. Today the battery has been converted into a promenade. Both Gardiner's Battery and Victoria Battery were higher or retired batteries that fired over the top of Saluting Battery that was on the coast.

References

Batteries in Gibraltar